You Know My Name is a 1999 American Western television film written and directed by John Kent Harrison and starring Sam Elliott, Arliss Howard, R. Lee Ermey, James Gammon, Carolyn McCormick, and James Parks. Its plot is based on the real-life story of lawman and gunslinger Bill Tilghman, who also directed and produced the 1915 Western film The Passing of the Oklahoma Outlaws.

Plot 
It is 1924 and the height of Prohibition. Oklahoma is still a wild and lawless haven for all manner of criminals, and even the men who are sworn to uphold the law are themselves corrupt and part of the new crime syndicates looking to expand into the new markets and towns. One of these men is Wiley Lynn (Arliss Howard), an unscrupulous federal agent who hides behind the power his badge gives him and ruthlessly deals with anyone who stands in his way, even his own wife. His drinking and drug addiction further feed his increasingly violent and erratic behavior.

Bill Tilghman (Sam Elliott) is a legendary lawman who is as famous for his shooting and exploits with one-time partner Wyatt Earp as he is for his virtue and honesty. Now retired from law enforcement to a more normal home life in Chandler, Oklahoma with his wife Zoe and their two young sons, he turns to directing and starring in a movie about his Wild West exploits. Concerned about audiences' growing appetite for movies that romanticize and exaggerate the past, he is especially intent on producing a movie that deglamorizes and more accurately portrays the lives of outlaws.

Fed up with the growing and indiscriminate violence and chaos in their town, the people of Cromwell reluctantly turn to Tilghman to help restore order and kick out the criminal element. Although he is faced with several corrupt business owners who frequently attempt to thwart his efforts, Tilghman quickly wins over the more intimidated or skeptical townsfolk with his honesty, wit and fair dealing. They gradually become more assertive and willing to take a more active role in directly dealing with the gamblers, swindlers, murderers, and prostitutes. Before long, Cromwell becomes a quiet and genteel town.

The new order does not sit well with Lynn, who dismisses Tilghman as a relic whose time has long passed. Having previously murdered three other men in cold blood, Lynn sets his sights on Tilghman.

Cast
Per Movies Made for Television.

 Sam Elliott as Bill Tilghman
 Arliss Howard as Wiley Lynn
 Carolyn McCormick as Zoe
 James Gammon as Real Arkansas Tom
 Walter Olkewicz as Mr. Killian
 Wendell Smith as False Arkansas Tom
 R. Lee Ermey as Marshal Nix
 James Parks as Alibi Joe
 Zachary Contos as Wiley's Baby

See also
 American Old West
 Bat Masterson

References

External links 
 
 

1999 television films
1999 films
1999 Western (genre) films
American Western (genre) television films
1990s English-language films
Films about old age
Films set in 1924
Films directed by John Kent Harrison